Someday This Could All Be Yours, Vol. 1 is the final album by the band The Paper Chase.

Track listing
All tracks written by John Congleton.
"If Nobody Moves Nobody Will Get Hurt (The Extinction)" – 5:53
"I'm Going to Heaven with or without You (The Forest Fire)" – 4:48
"The Common Cold (The Epidemic)" – 3:34
"The Laying of Hands The Speaking in Tongues (The Mass Hysteria)" – 2:52
"Your Money or Your Life (The Comet)" – 4:31
"What Should We Do with Your Body (The Lightning)" – 6:07
"This Is a Rape (The Flood)" – 3:52
"The Small of Your Back The Nape of Your Neck (The Blizzard)" – 3:42
"This Is Only a Test (The Tornado)" – 7:01
"We Have Ways to Make You Talk (The Human Condition)" – 4:15

References

2009 albums
The Paper Chase (band) albums
Kill Rock Stars albums